Wang Hao (born August 4, 1989) is a Chinese chess grandmaster. In November 2009, Wang became the fourth Chinese player to break through the 2700 Elo rating mark. 

In 2019, he qualified for the 2020 Candidates Tournament by winning the FIDE Grand Swiss Tournament 2019, making him the second Chinese player to qualify for a Candidates Tournament. Wang announced his retirement from professional chess at the end of the Candidates tournament in 2021, citing health issues. However, he returned to playing in 2022.

Grandmaster title 
In 2005, he became China's 20th Grandmaster at the age of 16.

As with Gata Kamsky, Wang Hao became a grandmaster without first gaining an International Master title. He achieved his three Grandmaster norms at the:

 2005 Aeroflot Open A2 Group in Moscow, Russia (February 14–24); score 6.5/9
 2005 Dubai Open in Dubai, United Arab Emirates (April 4–12); score 7.0/9
 2005 2nd Dato' Arthur Tan Malaysian Open in Kuala Lumpur, Malaysia (August 19–26); score 10/11

Career 
Wang was taught the rules of chess when he was six years old. He had attended a local youth center with the hopes of being taught Xiangqi (Chinese Chess); however, the trainer did not show up. He was introduced to chess that day instead and, almost by accident, his career was launched. Around one year later, Wang played in his first local junior tournament.

In 1999, Wang came third in the Under-10 division of the World Youth Chess Championships in Oropesa del Mar, Spain. In July 2002, he won the Qingdao Zhongfand Cup. In the following month, he played on board 4 for the gold medal-winning Chinese team in the Under-16 Chess Olympiad in Kuala Lumpur. In 2003, Wang beat Magnus Carlsen at the U14 World Youth Chess Championship. In July 2004, Wang again won gold with his national team in the U-16 Chess Olympiad in Calicut, India. He scored 8/9 on the first board, a result that also earned him the individual gold medal, producing a performance rating of 2577. In the same month he won the "Children of Asia", a youth tournament in Yakutsk, Russia.

Wang's first major tournament win was the Dubai Open in April 2005, when he was still untitled and finished clear first with a score of 7/9 points (rating performance of 2731), ahead of 53 grandmasters and 30 international masters. 
In August 2005, Wang won with 10/11 (two points clear ahead of the rest of the field) in the 2nd IGB Dato' Arthur Tan Malaysia Open in Kuala Lumpur (rating performance of 2843).
In October 2005, he came joint-first in the Beijing Zonal 3.3 tournament, and took the second place after a playoff match.

In February 2007, he won the GACC Tournament at the University of Malaya. 
In September 2007, he came in second place, after Zhang Pengxiang, at the Asian Individual Championship in Manila. In October 2007, Wang came third at the World Junior Chess Championship in Yerevan. In January 2008, at the 15th Asian Team Chess Championship in Visakhapatnam, Wang won an individual gold medal for his performance on board three (5/6). The national team had also won gold overall. 
In March 2008, he won the 23rd Reykjavik Open on tie-break with 7/9 points (2721 rating performance).
In April 2008, Wang competed at the Russian Team Championships in Dagomys, Sochi for the team 64 (Moscow), where he achieved a score of 8.0/11 (+5=6-0) and a performance rating of 2795.
In July 2008, he came 5th out of 10 players at the 9th Karpov International Tournament (Category 18, average Elo rating: 2691) in Poikovskiy, Russia. He scored 5/9 (+2=6-1) with a performance of 2734.
In September 2008, he competed in the 5th Russia v China Match in Ningbo, where he was the top scorer in the men's section with 3½/5 and a performance rating of 2844 playing with Wang Yue, Bu Xiangzhi, Ni Hua, Li Chao for the Chinese men's team.

In May 2009, he scored 5½/10 (+3=5-2) at the 39th Bosna International Tournament in Sarajevo with a 2725 performance, sharing second place with Borki Predojevic.
In November 2009, he competed in the FIDE World Cup: after defeating Joshua Friedel and Surya Shekhar Ganguly in the first two rounds, he was knocked out by Shakhriyar Mamedyarov. In May 2010, he won the 40th Bosna International Tournament.
In the following month, Wang Hao won the Chinese Chess Championship scoring 7½/11 and edging out 2004 champion Bu Xiangzhi and Zhou Jianchao on tiebreak. 
In September 2010 he competed in the Grand Slam of Shanghai, a four players round-robin tournament, in which he played Levon Aronian, Alexei Shirov and Vladimir Kramnik. Wang Hao, the lowest ranked player in the tournament, scored three draws and three losses.

He has assisted in preparing Levon Aronian for the 2011 Candidate Matches. In a report on the 2010 Tal Memorial, the noted chess journalist Ilya Odessky writes that Levon Aronian "in his teasing style" named Wang Hao as the most talented player of the tournament. In August 2012, he won the Biel Grandmaster Tournament in Bienne, Switzerland, with six wins, one draw, and three losses. The tournament was played with three points for a win, and this result put Wang one point ahead of Magnus Carlsen, who had four wins and six draws. Wang Hao was one of the AGON nominees for the FIDE Grand Prix Series 2012–13. In the first stage, held in London, he placed sixth with 5½/11. He shared the first place with Sergey Karjakin and Alexander Morozevich at the second stage, that took place in Tashkent, scoring 6½/11. In the Beijing stage, he was sixth on 5½/11. In the final stage in Paris, Wang finished tenth with 5/11.

At the 2013 Norway Chess tournament, Wang Hao finished in seventh place with three wins, three draws, and three losses. Wang was tied for last after five rounds, when he lost against the eventual tail-ender Jon Ludvig Hammer. However, he ended the tournament very strongly with two wins over the World Championship finalists Magnus Carlsen and Viswanathan Anand. In April 2014, he competed in the B Group of the Gashimov Memorial and scored 5/9, sharing third place with Etienne Bacrot. Later that year, Wang played for Azebaijani team SOCAR which won the European Club Cup in Bilbao. In June 2015, Wang Hao scored 6½/9 in the 10th Edmonton International Tournament, tying for the second place with Vassily Ivanchuk and Surya Shekhar Ganguly. On December 31, 2015 Wang won the 4th Al Ain Classic tournament scoring 8/9, 1½ points ahead of the nearest followers. He already ensured the victory with a round to spare. In March 2016 he won the 6th HDBank Cup in Ho Chi Minh City, Vietnam with 8/9.

In April 2017, Wang Hao came first in the Sharjah Masters tournament. The following month, he won the Asian Continental Championship in Chengdu, edging out Bu Xiangzhi on tiebreak score, after both players finished on 7/9 points (+5−0=4). 

In October 2019, Wang Hao qualified for the 2020 Candidates Tournament by winning the FIDE Grand Swiss Tournament 2019 with a score of 8/11 (+6−1=4). In December 2019, he won the Yinzhou Cup in Ningbo, China. When the Candidates finished in 2021, Wang Hao placed last. He left retirement to participate in Norway Chess 2022.

China Chess League
Wang Hao played for Hebei chess club in the China Chess League (CCL).

Personal life
Wang attended the School of Journalism and Communication of Peking University.

References

External links

 
 
 
 
 Wang Hao's Elo rating table  
 Wang Hao - "Profile of a chess prodigy" part 1 
 Wang Hao - "Profile of a chess prodigy" part 2

1989 births
Living people
Chess grandmasters
Chess Olympiad competitors
Chess players from Harbin
Asian Games medalists in chess
Chess players at the 2010 Asian Games
Asian Games gold medalists for China
Medalists at the 2010 Asian Games
Universiade medalists in chess
Universiade silver medalists for China
Medalists at the 2011 Summer Universiade